The 1945–46 Fort Wayne Zollner Pistons season was the fifth season of the franchise in the National Basketball League. The team was looking to return to the finals for a fifth consecutive year and win their third straight title. The team once again claimed the best regular season record by winning 26 games and Bobby McDermott was awarded his fourth and last NBL MVP Award. Both Buddy Jeannette and Robert McDermott were named to the All-NBL first team. Going into the playoffs the Pistons met the Rochester Royals in the first round but were upset in four games making it the first season in team history where they failed to reach the finals. This season marked the end of the Pistons NBL dominance as both McDermott and Jeannette left the franchise within the next year.

Roster

League standings

Eastern Division

Western Division

Awards and honors
Robert McDermott won the NBL MVP award for the fourth straight season.

References

Fort Wayne Zollner Pistons seasons
Fort Wayne